Qayyumabad is a suburb of Korangi Town in Karachi, Sindh, Pakistan. Confined within 109 acres, Qayyumabad  is one of the most densely populated and polluted residential areas of Karachi. It is home to more than 70,000 people — including Pakhtun, Punjabi, Sindhi, Baloch and Urdu-speaking ethnicities, as well as Christians and scheduled caste Hindus. A report by Dawn suggests that DHA has illegally grabbed 53 acres belonging to Qayyumabad.

History 
Qayyumabad is named after Begum Qayyum.

References

External links 
 Karachi website
 https://web.archive.org/web/20060613011024/http://www.karachicity.gov.pk/town/index.asp?txtTown=Korangi Korangi

Neighbourhoods of Karachi